Comaroma is a genus of araneomorph spiders in the family Anapidae, first described by Philipp Bertkau in 1889.

Species
 it contains six species:
Comaroma hatsushibai Ono, 2005 – Japan
Comaroma maculosa Oi, 1960 – China, Korea, Japan
Comaroma mendocino (Levi, 1957) – USA
Comaroma nakahirai (Yaginuma, 1959) – Japan
Comaroma simoni Bertkau, 1889 – Europe
Comaroma tongjunca Zhang & Chen, 1994 – China

References

Anapidae
Araneomorphae genera
Spiders of Asia
Spiders of the United States
Taxa named by Philipp Bertkau